Turbo kenwilliamsi, common name the beautiful turban, is a species of sea snail, a marine gastropod mollusk in the family Turbinidae, the turban snails.

Description
The length of the shell varies between 40 mm and 80 mm.

Distribution
This marine species occurs off Western Australia to North Australia.

References

 Alf A. & Kreipl K. (2003). A Conchological Iconography: The Family Turbinidae, Subfamily Turbininae, Genus Turbo. Conchbooks, Hackenheim Germany.

External links
 To GenBank (11 nucleotides; 3 proteins)
 To World Register of Marine Species
 

kenwilliamsi
Gastropods of Australia
Gastropods described in 2008